Mary Porter Tileston Hemenway (1820 – 6 March 1894) was an American philanthropist. She sponsored the Hemenway Southwestern Archaeological Expedition (1886-1894), the first of its kind to the American Southwest.

She also initiated a variety of activities related to improving education and homemaking skills for girls, opening the first kitchen in a public school in the United States. She also founded a normal school for gymnastics training for girls, treating the whole person.

Early years
She was born in New York City in 1820, the daughter of Thomas Tileston (1796-1864), one of the wealthiest shipping merchants in the city, and Mary (née Porter) Tileson.

In 1840, Tileston married Edward Augustus Holyoke Hemenway (1803–1876), a Boston merchant seventeen years older, and moved to his city. They first lived in a house at the corner of Tremont and Beacon streets. By 1845, they moved to Winthrop Square. In 1853, they moved to a house on the corner of Mt. Vernon and Walnut streets, on Beacon Hill.

They had several children: daughters Charlotte Augusta Hemenway (1841-1865), Alice (d. in infancy), Amy Hemenway (1848-1911), who married Louis Cabot; and Edith (~1851-1904). Their son, Augustus Jr. (1853–1931), married Harriet Lawrence.

Career

After her eldest daughter Charlotte's death in 1865, at the age of 24, Hemenway became more involved in philanthropy. She worked to strengthen education in the South, improve homemaking skills among girls, and promote knowledge of the American past. She was a member of James Freeman Clarke's Church of the Disciples.

In 1876 Hemenway donated $100,000 to save the Old South Meeting House from destruction. She sponsored summer vacation schools, founded the Boston Normal School of Cookery in 1887 to train teachers, promoted a conference on physical training, and established the Boston Normal School of Gymnastics in 1889.

As a wealthy widow, she continued such philanthropic activity, making large contributions to American archeology. The Hemenway Southwestern Archaeological Expedition (1886-1894), which was the first major scientific archaeological expedition undertaken in the American Southwest, was sponsored by Hemenway. Her ambition was to establish a private museum called the Pueblo Museum at Salem, Massachusetts, to be based on the expedition's archaeological finds.

The expedition did find and identify the prehistoric Hohokam culture in the Southwest.

Death and legacy
The expedition was terminated in 1894 with the death of Hemenway. She died in a diabetic coma at her home on Beacon Hill. She is remembered on the Boston Women's Heritage Trail.

References

External links
 
 Mary Tileson Hemenway Portrait, Wellesley College

1820 births
1894 deaths
Philanthropists from New York (state)
Deaths from diabetes
People from New York City
19th-century American philanthropists
People from Beacon Hill, Boston